Listed below are the canoe sprint world best times in Sprint canoe and Sprint kayak events. The ICF only acknowledge world best times set in finals of Olympic Games, World Championships, World Cups, Continental Championships and "other canoe sprint events with acceptable high technical level".

Men Kayak

Women Kayak

Men Canoe

Women Canoe

References 

Records in canoeing
Canoeing